Libor Pimek (born 3 August 1963) is a former professional male tennis player.

Pimek's best Grand Slam singles result came at the 1987 US Open when he reached the 3rd round, losing to Swede Mats Wilander in straight sets. He won one singles tournament during his career at the Bavarian Open, reaching a career-high ranking of world No. 21 in April 1985 (and No. 15 in doubles in July 1996).

Pimek competed as a Czechoslovak early in his career, competing for the country a few times in the Davis Cup in the mid-1980s, before representing Belgium internationally. As a Davis Cup player for Belgium, he won 4 ties (Israel 1994, Denmark and France 1997, The Netherlands 1998)

Career finals

Singles (1 win, 1 loss)

Doubles (17 wins, 12 losses)

References

External links
 
 
 

1963 births
Living people
Belgian male tennis players
Czech expatriate sportspeople in Belgium
Czechoslovak male tennis players
Czech male tennis players
Sportspeople from Most (city)